

Eurobasket 2009 tournament roster 
The upcoming tournament in which Lithuania will compete in will be the Eurobasket 2009 in Poland. The roster of the team is given below:

|}
| valign="top" |
 Head coach

 Assistant coach(es)

Legend
(C) Team captain
Club field describes current pro club
Age field is age on September 7, 2009
|}

Candidates that did not make for the final team:

Preparation matches
Note: All times are local

Eurobasket 2009
Note: All times are local

Preliminary round

Qualifying round

References

Lithuania
2009
Eurobasket